William Wallace Smith Bliss (August 17, 1815 – August 5, 1853) was a United States Army officer and mathematics professor. A gifted mathematician, he taught at West Point and also served as a line officer.

In December 1848 Bliss married Mary Elizabeth Taylor, youngest daughter of President=elect Zachary Taylor, whom he would serve as presidential secretary. Five years later Bliss contracted yellow fever in New Orleans and died at the age of 37.

Having become interested in the various Native American tribes, Bliss learned a number of their languages and studied their cultures. He was a member of the Royal Society of Northern Antiquaries of Copenhagen, Denmark, and an Honorary Member of the American Ethnological Society. Gifted at languages, he was able to read thirteen and could speak a number of those fluently.

Early life and education
Born in Whitehall, New York, he was the son of Captain John Bliss (of Lebanon, New Hampshire) and Olive Hall Simonds (of Todd County, Kentucky).

Military career
At the age of 14, Bliss entered the United States Military Academy on September 1, 1829. He showed very great skills in mathematics while a student. He graduated July 1, 1833 (age 17) and commissioned as a second lieutenant in the 4th Infantry Regiment. It was his choice to serve in the infantry.

He served in the Fort Mitchell army garrison in Alabama from 1833 to 1834. During 1835 he was involved in operations against the Cherokee during Indian Removal, which moved most of them to Indian Territory west of the Mississippi River.

From October 2, 1834 (age 19) until January 4, 1840 (age 24), Bliss served as assistant professor of mathematics at West Point. As a captain, he served as chief of staff from 1840 until 1841 to Brigadier General Walker Keith Armistead, the commanding general in the Seminole Wars. He served at Fort Smith, Arkansas, and at Fort Jesup, Louisiana, as a staff officer.

In 1845, Bliss took part in the United States military occupation of the Republic of Texas, prior to its annexation. Between April 1846 and November 1847, he took part in the Mexican War, including fighting in the battles of Palo Alto, Resaca de la Palma and Buena Vista. He was brevetted to major in May 1846, and brevetted to lieutenant colonel in February 1847 for gallant and meritorious service.

During his entire service in Texas and Mexico, he served as chief of staff to Major General Zachary Taylor. Bliss was noted for his efficiency and skills as a high-level aide. His writing was simple, elegant, vigorous, and picturesque. He was cheerful and popular with the public.

Intellectual pursuits
He received the honorary degree of Master of Arts from Dartmouth College, New Hampshire, in 1849. He was a member of the Royal Society of Northern Antiquaries of Copenhagen, Denmark, and an Honorary Member of the American Ethnological Society. 

He had a talent for languages, and was fluent in at least thirteen. George Perkins Marsh, the philologist, said that Bliss was the best linguist in America.

Marriage and family
On December 5, 1848, at Baton Rouge, Louisiana, Bliss married President-elect Zachary Taylor's youngest daughter, Mary Elizabeth (1824–1909).

Political career
Taylor appointed Bliss as Private Secretary to the President (he was able to take leave from the Army for this assignment).

As the President's wife took no part in formal social events, she delegated the social role to their daughter Mary Elizabeth Bliss, who effectively became the First Lady of the White House at the age of 22. The popular young couple seemed destined to become powerful figures in Washington.

The president died suddenly in July 1850. Bliss and his wife Mary accompanied her widowed mother to Pascagoula, Mississippi. She died there in 1852, at the home of another daughter.

Bliss was assigned as Adjutant-General of the Western Division of the Army. Following a summer visit to New Orleans on behalf of University of Louisiana, Bliss contracted yellow fever.  He died at Pascagoula on August 5, 1853, aged 37. He was buried at Girod Street Cemetery (defunct), New Orleans. A century later, his remains were moved to Fort Bliss National Cemetery in Texas.

Legacy and honors
 1849 the State of New York presented him with a Gold Medal for his bravery in the Mexican–American War, at Palo Alto, Resaca de la Palma, Monterrey, and Buena Vista.
 March 8, 1854, the Post of El Paso was renamed in his honor as Fort Bliss.
 A twenty-foot memorial, made of Italian marble, was erected in his honor in the Girod Street Cemetery, New Orleans. It noted he was "a finished scholar, an accomplished gentleman and a gallant soldier." In 1955, the cemetery was condemned for new construction in the Central Business District. When his remains were removed to the Fort Bliss National Cemetery, the monument was also moved and became the center piece of LTC William W. S. Bliss Parade Field, near Hinman Hall in Fort Bliss.

References
Carl Sferrazza, America's First Families: An Inside View of 200 Years of Private Life in the White House, Lisa Drew Books

External links
The Bliss Family History Society
Fort Bliss National Cemetery

My Southern Family, Rootsweb
Military biography of William Bliss, from the Cullum biographies

1815 births
1853 deaths
Deaths from yellow fever
Personal secretaries to the President of the United States
United States Military Academy alumni
American military personnel of the Mexican–American War
United States Army officers
American people of the Seminole Wars
Infectious disease deaths in Mississippi
Zachary Taylor family
People from Whitehall, New York
Burials at Girod Street Cemetery